An Innocent Magdalene is a 1916 American silent drama film directed by  Allan Dwan. It is considered to be a lost film.

Cast
 Lillian Gish as Dorothy Raleigh
 Spottiswoode Aitken as Col. Raleigh
 Sam De Grasse as Forbes Stewart
 Mary Alden as The Woman
 Seymour Hastings as The Preacher
 Jennie Lee as Mammy
 William De Vaull as Old Joe

See also
 Lillian Gish filmography

References

External links

1916 films
1916 drama films
Silent American drama films
American silent feature films
American black-and-white films
Films directed by Allan Dwan
Triangle Film Corporation films
Lost American films
Films about gambling
1916 lost films
Lost drama films
1910s American films